McCord may refer to:


Places

Canada
McCord, Saskatchewan
McCord Museum, Quebec
Mount McCord

United States
McCord, Oklahoma
McCord, Wisconsin
McCord Bend, Missouri
McCord Crossroads, Alabama
McCord Village, an archaeological site in Wisconsin

Other uses
 McCord (surname)
 USS McCord
 3527 McCord, a Main-belt asteroid

See also